Three ships of the United States Navy have been named Cabot, after the explorer John Cabot.

 , was a 14-gun brig purchased in 1775 and captured by the British in 1777.
 , was renamed Lexington (CV-16) on 16 June 1942, prior to launch.
 , was a light aircraft carrier active in World War II. She was transferred to Spain in 1967 where she served as Dédalo. The ship was scrapped in 2001.

References

United States Navy ship names